Nothodanis is a genus of butterflies in the family Lycaenidae. The single species of this genus, Nothodanis schaeffera (Eschscholtz, 1821) is found in the Australasian and Indomalayan realms.
Subspecies
Nothodanis schaeffera schaeffera (Eschscholtz, 1821)  Philippines and  Indonesia.
Nothodanis schaeffera annamensis (Fruhstorfer, 1903)  Vietnam.
Nothodanis schaeffera caesius (Grose-Smith) New Guinea
Nothodanis schaeffera caledonica (C. & R. Felder, [1865]) New Caledonia
Nothodanis schaeffera cepheis (Druce, 1891) Solomon Islands
Nothodanis schaeffera esme (Grose-Smith, 1894) Bismark archipelago , New Britain and New Ireland
Nothodanis schaeffera soranus (Fruhstorfer, 1915)  Halmaheira, Batjan, Ternate

External links
"Nothodanis Hirowatari, 1992" at Markku Savela's Lepidoptera and some other life forms

Polyommatini
Lycaenidae genera